David Grieco (born 19 September 1951) is an Italian  director, screenwriter and former actor.

Biography
Grandson of Ruggero Grieco, one of the founders of the Italian Communist Party, Grieco began his movie career as an actor and worked with directors such as Franco Zeffirelli and his two mentors Pier Paolo Pasolini and Bernardo Bertolucci. Pasolini, who wanted Grieco as his assistant director, has been the most important source of inspiration for Grieco.

At the age of 19, he abandoned his acting career and became a film critic for l'Unità.

During his 30s, he started directing documentaries and TV commercials. In 2004 he directed his first feature film Evilenko, starring Malcolm McDowell, while his last film is the 2016 movie La macchinazione, starring Massimo Ranieri as Pier Paolo Pasolini.

Filmography

Director
 Evilenko (2004)
 La macchinazione (2016)

Screenwriter
 Caruso Pascoski di padre polacco (1988, directed by Francesco Nuti)
 Mortacci (1989, directed by Sergio Citti)
 We Free Kings (1996, directed by Sergio Citti)

Actor
 Romeo and Juliet (1968, directed by Franco Zeffirelli)
 Teorema (1968, directed by Pier Paolo Pasolini)
 Partner (1968, directed by Bernardo Bertolucci)
 Hell Ride (2008, directed by Larry Bishop)

Awards

David di Donatello
 2005: David di Donatello for Best New Director nomination for Evilenko

Nastro d'Argento
 1997: Nastro d'Argento for Best Screenplay nomination for We Free Kings
 2005: Nastro d'Argento for Best New Director nomination for Evilenko

References

External links

1951 births
Living people
Film people from Rome
Italian film directors
Italian screenwriters
Italian male screenwriters